Edmond Davall (Orbe, 1793 - Lausanne, 1860) was a Swiss botanist and politician.

He was son of the English-Swiss botanist Edmund Davall.

Sources
 Cédric ROSSIER, mémoire de licence de l'Université de Lausanne, septembre 2003.
 "Edmond Davall : approche biographique de l’homme et du forestier", Cédric ROSSIER, in Revue historique vaudoise, 2005.
 J. Barbey, «Les forestiers D.», in Journal forestier suisse, 1953, 391–395.

1793 births
1860 deaths
People from Orbe
19th-century Swiss botanists